Ford is a Victorian-built area of Plymouth, Devon, England.

Between 1890 and 1964 the area was served by Ford railway station.

References 

Suburbs of Plymouth, Devon